Warner is an unincorporated community in Washington County, in the U.S. state of Ohio.

History
A post office called Warner was established in 1871. Warner was laid out around 1873, and named for General A. J. Warner.

References

Unincorporated communities in Washington County, Ohio
Unincorporated communities in Ohio